Orzhytsia is an urban-type settlement located in Lubny Raion of Poltava Oblast in Ukraine, and formerly the administrative center of Orzhytsia Raion. It is located on the Orzhytsia, a right tributary of the Sula, a tributary of the Dnieper. Population:

Economy

Transportation
Orzhytsia is connected by local roads with Lubny and Zolotonosha.

The closest railway station is in Lubny.

References

Urban-type settlements in Lubny Raion
Lubensky Uyezd